Gloria is a 1980 American neo-noir crime thriller film written and directed by John Cassavetes. It tells the story of a gangster's girlfriend who goes on the run with a young boy who is being hunted by the mob for information he may or may not have. It stars Gena Rowlands, Julie Carmen, Buck Henry, and John Adames.

Plot
In New York City, in the South Bronx, Jeri Dawn is heading home with groceries. Inside the lobby of her apartment building, she passes a man whose dress and appearance are out of place. The woman quickly boards the elevator.

She is met in her apartment by her husband Jack Dawn, an accountant for a New York City mob family. There is a contract on Jack and his family, as he has been acting as an informant for the FBI. Suddenly, the family's neighbor, Gloria Swenson, rings their doorbell, asking to borrow some coffee. Jeri tells Gloria what looks like an impending hit on her family and implores Gloria to protect the children. Gloria, formerly a mobster's girlfriend, tells Jeri that she doesn't like kids but begrudgingly agrees. The Dawns' daughter Joan refuses to leave and locks herself in the bathroom. While the family attempts to get Joan, Gloria takes their young son Phil, and an incriminating accounts ledger, to her apartment, narrowly missing the hit squad.

After hearing loud shotgun blasts from the Dawns' apartment, a visibly shaken Gloria decides that she and Phil must go into hiding. She quickly packs a bag and leaves the building with Phil, just as a police SWAT team are entering with heavy weapons. Meanwhile, a crowd of onlookers and news reporters have gathered in front of the building, and a cameraman captures a picture of Gloria leaving the building with Phil.

Gloria and Phil take a cab into Manhattan, where they hide out in an empty apartment belonging to a friend of hers. While Phil sleeps, Gloria has the TV on and hears a news report say that there was a mob hit in the South Bronx, and that the name of the suspected abductor is Gloria Swenson.

The next morning, Gloria and Phil sneak out of the apartment just as a group of gangsters close in on them. The gangsters are old friends of Gloria's, and confront her on the sidewalk outside, exhorting her to give up Phil and the ledger. In desperation, Gloria shoots her revolver at the car of five gangsters, which takes off and flips over. Gloria realizes both her fate and Phil's are now deeply intertwined, and that they will have to leave New York to survive.

Gloria goes to the bank to empty her safe deposit box, and the two settle for the night at a flophouse. She confronts another group of gangsters at a restaurant; she asks for immunity in exchange for the ledger. "Only Mr. Tanzinni can agree to that", says one of the goons, so she takes some of their guns and flees.

The next day, Gloria tells Phil that she plans to send him away to a boarding school. Offended by her intentions, Phil claims he is an independent grown man who can manage alone. Gloria decides to abandon him, and have a drink. She is soon filled with guilt for leaving the child and rushes back to look for him; however, he has been captured by some wise-guys. Gloria rescues him, killing one mobster in the process, and fleeing from two others via a taxi and the subway, where several by-standers help her escape.

The two eventually make it to a hotel room, where Gloria laments the mob's strength and ubiquitous presence, explaining to Phil that she was once the mistress of Tanzinni himself. She meets with Tanzinni, relinquishes the ledger, and then flees, killing one gangster as another shoots down upon her elevator car. Phil waits several hours, then flees to Pittsburgh via rail. At a cemetery, Phil and Gloria (the latter disguised as the former's grandmother arriving in a limousine after miraculously surviving her ordeal) reunite.

Cast
 Gena Rowlands as Gloria Swenson
 Julie Carmen as Jeri Dawn
 Buck Henry as Jack Dawn
 John Adames as Phil Dawn
 Lupe Garnica as Margarita Vargas
 John Finnegan as Frank
 Tom Noonan, J.C. Quinn, and Sonny Landham as Mob Henchmen
 Lawrence Tierney as The Broadway Bartender

Production
John Cassavetes did not originally intend to direct his screenplay; he planned merely to sell the story to Columbia Pictures. However, once his wife, Gena Rowlands, was asked to play the title character in the film, she asked Cassavetes to direct it.

Critical reception
On review aggregator Rotten Tomatoes, the film has a 93% approval rating based on 28 reviews, with an average rating of 7.1/10. The website's critics consensus reads: "A comparatively commercial entry from director John Cassavetes, Glorias pulpy pleasures are elevated by his observant touch and Gena Rowlands' galvanizing star performance."

Reviewing for the Chicago Sun-Times, Roger Ebert gave the film three out of four stars and described it as "tough, sweet and goofy", as well as "fun and engaging but slight". He believed the overly silly nature of the script is redeemed by "Cassavetes' reliance on a tried-and-true plot construction" and the acting performances, particularly that of Rowlands, who he said "propels the action with such appealing nervous energy that we don't have the heart to stop and think how silly everything is".

The Japanese filmmaker Akira Kurosawa cited Gloria as one of his favorite films.

Awards and nominations

The film is recognized by American Film Institute in these lists:
 2003: AFI's 100 Years...100 Heroes & Villains:
 Gloria Swenson – Nominated Hero

Remakes and influences
The film was remade in 1999 under the same title with a screenplay by Steve Antin. The remake was directed by Sidney Lumet. It starred Sharon Stone and Jean-Luke Figueroa.

Other films inspired by Gloria include Erick Zonca's 2008 film Julia, starring Tilda Swinton and Luc Besson's 1994 film Léon: The Professional. In 2013, Paul Schrader was planning his own remake of the film, starring Lindsay Lohan.

Notes

References

Bibliography
 Cassavetes, John and Raymond Carney (2001). "Chpt 10: Gloria (1978–1980)" in Cassavetes on Cassavetes. Macmillan. .
 Morris, George (1980). "Lady on the Lam", Texas Monthly. Vol. 8, No. 10. ISSN 0148-7736.

External links
 
 
 
 
 

1980 films
1980s crime thriller films
1980 crime drama films
American crime drama films
American crime thriller films
American neo-noir films
Columbia Pictures films
1980s English-language films
Films scored by Bill Conti
Films directed by John Cassavetes
Films about organized crime in the United States
Films set in New Jersey
Films set in New York City
Films shot in New Jersey
Films shot in New York City
Golden Lion winners
Golden Raspberry Award winning films
1980s American films